The flat-headed vole (Alticola strelzowi) is a species of rodent in the family Cricetidae.
It is found in China, Kazakhstan, Mongolia, and Russian Federation.

References

Further reading

Alticola
Mammals of Asia
Mammals described in 1899
Taxonomy articles created by Polbot